Eumorpha translineatus is a moth of the  family Sphingidae.

Distribution 
It is known from Brazil and Bolivia.

Description 
It can be distinguished from all other Eumorpha species by the pale brown forewing upperside crossed by a series of narrow dark brown transverse lines resembling the pattern seen in species of Marumba and the almost circular dark brown patch near the middle of the posterior margin. It can be distinguished from Eumorpha adamsi by the lack of pink coloration on the hindwing upperside.

Biology 
The larvae probably feed on Vitaceae species.

References

Eumorpha
Moths described in 1895